The NBA's Most Improved Player Award (MIP) is an annual National Basketball Association (NBA) award given to the player who has shown the most progress during the regular season compared to previous seasons. The winner is selected by a panel of sportswriters throughout the United States and Canada, each of whom casts a vote for first, second and third place selections. Each first-place vote is worth five points; each second-place vote is worth three points, and each third-place vote is worth one point. The player with the highest point total, regardless of the number of first-place votes, wins the award. The criteria for selecting the most improved player was initially open-ended, but the NBA clarified in later years that it was intended for an up-and-coming player who improved dramatically and not a player who made a comeback, distinguishing it from the defunct NBA Comeback Player of the Year Award. Starting with the 2022–23 NBA season, winners receive the George Mikan Trophy, named after the five-time NBA champion.

Since its inception, the award has been given to 36 players. No player has ever won the award twice. Boris Diaw, Kevin Love, Pascal Siakam, and Giannis Antetokounmpo are the only award winners to win an NBA Championship, Siakam is the only winner to win a championship in the same season as the award, and Antetokounmpo is the only winner to win NBA Finals MVP. Rony Seikaly, Gheorghe Mureșan, Boris Diaw, Hedo Türkoğlu, Goran Dragić, Giannis Antetokounmpo, and Pascal Siakam are the only award winners born outside the United States. 

Alvin Robertson, Dana Barros, Tracy McGrady, Jermaine O'Neal, Danny Granger, Kevin Love, Paul George, Jimmy Butler, Giannis Antetokounmpo, Victor Oladipo, Brandon Ingram, Julius Randle, and Ja Morant have won the award and been selected as an NBA All-Star in the same season; Dale Ellis, Kevin Duckworth, Kevin Johnson, Gilbert Arenas, Zach Randolph, Goran Dragic, and Pascal Siakam were the other winners who were selected in a later season to play in the All-Star Game. Only McGrady, O'Neal, George, Dragić, Antetokounmpo, Oladipo, Randle and Morant won the award and were named to the All-NBA Team in the same season. Pascal Siakam made the All-NBA Second Team the year after he won the award. The Indiana Pacers and Orlando Magic have both seen five players win the award, the most in the NBA. Giannis Antetokounmpo is the first recipient of the award to later become an NBA MVP. Tracy McGrady is the only recipient to win a scoring title as well as being the first recipient of the award to be named to the Naismith Memorial Basketball Hall of Fame.

Winners

Teams

See also

 NBA Development League Most Improved Player Award

Notes

References
General

Specific

Most Improved Player
 National Basketball Association lists
 Awards established in 1986
 Most improved awards